Wust-Fischbeck is a municipality in the district of Stendal, in Saxony-Anhalt, Germany. It was formed on 1 January 2010 by the merger of the former municipalities Wust and Fischbeck.

References

Stendal (district)